Kampung Bali is an administrative village in the Tanah Abang district of Indonesia. It has postal code of 10250.

See also 
 Tanah Abang
 List of administrative villages of Jakarta

Administrative villages in Jakarta